Aloeides plowesi, the Plowes' copper, is a butterfly in the family Lycaenidae. It is found in Zimbabwe.

Adults are on wing from August to November and in May and June.

References

Butterflies described in 1973
Aloeides
Endemic fauna of Zimbabwe
Butterflies of Africa